Arhan (also Romanized as Arhān and Arahān; also known as Arkhan) is a village in Sain Qaleh Rural District, in the Central District of Abhar County, Zanjan Province, Iran. At the 2006 census, its population was 1,077, in 238 families.

References 

Populated places in Abhar County